Johnstone North railway station was a railway station serving the town of Johnstone, Renfrewshire, Scotland as part of the Dalry and North Johnstone Line on the Glasgow and South Western Railway.

History
The station opened on 1 June 1905. An earlier terminus station, also called Johnstone North, on the Paisley Canal Line had operated nearby in 1885, but the opening of the Kilbarchan Loop made it redundant and so this station was built as a replacement. The station closed to passengers on 7 March 1955.

To the east of the station was Cart Junction with the Bridge of Weir Railway, and onwards to the triangular junction with the Glasgow, Paisley, Kilmarnock and Ayr Railway.

The overbridge to the west of the station was removed as part of the construction associated with the Johnstone and Kilbarchan bypass (A737 road) in the early 1990s. 

In 2007 the site was flattened to make way for a new Morrisons Superstore.

References

Notes

Sources 
 
 

Disused railway stations in Renfrewshire
Railway stations in Great Britain opened in 1905
Railway stations in Great Britain closed in 1955
Former Glasgow and South Western Railway stations
Johnstone